The canton of Agon-Coutainville is an administrative division of the Manche department, northwestern France. It was created at the French canton reorganisation which came into effect in March 2015. Its seat is in Agon-Coutainville.

Composition 

It consists of the following communes:

Agon-Coutainville
Auxais
Blainville-sur-Mer
Feugères
Geffosses
Gonfreville
Gorges
Gouville-sur-Mer
Hauteville-la-Guichard
Marchésieux
Montcuit
Muneville-le-Bingard
Nay
Périers
Raids
Saint-Germain-sur-Sèves
Saint-Malo-de-la-Lande
Saint-Martin-d'Aubigny
Saint-Sauveur-Villages
Saint-Sébastien-de-Raids

Councillors

Pictures of the canton

References 

Cantons of Manche